The KiHa 43000 was a train and one of the first two streamlined diesel multiple units in Japan, the other being the Kihani 5000. Its development was inspired by the "Fliegender Hamburger" in Germany.

References

Japanese National Railways
43000
Train-related introductions in 1937